This is the list of cathedrals in Indonesia.

Roman Catholic
Cathedrals of the Roman Catholic Church in Indonesia:

Ecclesiastical Province of Ende
Christ the King Cathedral of the Archdiocese of Ende
Holy Spirit Cathedral of the Diocese of Denpasar
Cathedral of the Queen of the Rosary of the Diocese of Larantuka
Cathedral of St. Joseph of the Diocese of Maumere
Cathedral of St. Joseph and St. Mary of the Assumption of the Diocese of Ruteng

Ecclesiastical Province of Jakarta
Cathedral of St. Mary of the Assumption of the Archdiocese of Jakarta
St. Peter’s Cathedral of the Diocese of Bandung
Cathedral of the Blessed Virgin Mary of the Diocese of Bogor

Ecclesiastical Province of Kupang
Christ the King Cathedral of the Archdiocese of Kupang
Cathedral of St. Mary Immaculate of the Diocese of Atambua
Holy Spirit Cathedral of the Diocese of Weetebula

Ecclesiastical Province of Makassar
Cathedral of the Sacred Heart of Jesus of the Archdiocese of Makassar
Cathedral of St. Francis Xavier of the Diocese of Amboina
Cathedral of the Most Sacred Heart of Mary of the Diocese of Manado

Ecclesiastical Province of Medan
Cathedral of St. Mary of the Archdiocese of Medan
Cathedral of St. Theresia of the Diocese of Padang
Cathedral of St. Therese of the Diocese of Sibolga

Ecclesiastical Province of Merauke
Cathedral of St. Francis Xavier of the Archdiocese of Merauke
Cathedral of the Holy Cross of the Diocese of Agats
Christ the King Cathedral of the Diocese of Jayapura
Cathedral of St. Augustine of the Diocese of Manokwari-Sorong
Cathedral of the Three Kings of the Diocese of Timika

Ecclesiastical Province of Palembang
Cathedral of St. Mary of the Archdiocese of Palembang
Cathedral of St. Joseph of the Diocese of Pangkal-Pinang
Cathedral of Christ the King of the Diocese of Tanjungkarang

Ecclesiastical Province of Pontianak
Cathedral of St. Joseph of the Archdiocese of Pontianak
Cathedral of St. Gemma Galgani of the Diocese of Ketapang 
Cathedral of the Sacred Heart of Jesus of the Diocese of Sanggau
Cathedral of Christ the King of the Diocese of Sintang

Ecclesiastical Province of Samarinda
Cathedral of St. Mary of the Archdiocese of Samarinda 
Cathedral of the Holy Family of the Diocese of Banjarmasin
Cathedral of St. Mary of the Diocese of Palangkaraya
Cathedral of Our Lady of the Assumption of the Diocese of Tanjung Selor

Ecclesiastical Province of Semarang
Cathedral of Mary Queen of the Holy Rosary of the Archdiocese of Semarang
Cathedral of Our Lady of Mount Carmel of the Diocese of Malang
Christ the King Cathedral of the Diocese of Purwokerto
Cathedral of the Sacred Heart of Jesus of the Diocese of Surabaya

See also

List of cathedrals
List of church buildings in Indonesia
Christianity in Indonesia

References

Cathedrals in Indonesia
Indonesia
Cathedrals
Cathedrals